Roseller "Matoy" Barinaga (born August 4, 1936) is a Filipino lawyer and politician from the province of Zamboanga del Norte. He previously served as Vice Mayor of Dipolog (1970–1978), Mayor of Dipolog (1978–1986; 1988–1998), member of the Philippine House of Representatives from the 2nd legislative district of Zamboanga del Norte from 1998 to 2007, and Undersecretary for Mindanao of the National Anti-Poverty Commission (2016–2018).

Apart from his political career, Barinaga served as a professor and dean in Jose Rizal Memorial State University - Main Campus in Dapitan.

Political career
Barinaga, then a vice mayor at that time, was appointed as city mayor by Philippine President Ferdinand Marcos in 1978. He would be removed from the position after the 1986 EDSA People Power Revolution. Not long enough, Barinaga would return to city hall as mayor in 1988 until his resignation in 1998 when he ran and won as representative for the 2nd District of Zamboanga del Norte until 2007.

After several failed attempts since the 2007 local elections (with the exception of the 2016 local elections), Barinaga won a seat in the Dipolog City Council placing third overall, making his return to the political limelight after 15 years.

Honors
A classroom inside Dalupan Building in University of the East in Manila was renamed Cong. Roseller L. Barinaga Room being an alumnus of the UE College of Law.

References

|-

|-

|-

|-

Living people
Politicians from Zamboanga del Norte
Mayors of places in Zamboanga del Norte
Members of the House of Representatives of the Philippines from Zamboanga del Norte
Filipino city and municipal councilors
1936 births